Cleo Hartwig (20 October 1907 – 18 June 1988) was an American sculptor who worked in stone, wood, terra cotta, plaster, paper, woodcut, and ceramic. She won a number of awards, including national awards, and her work is exhibited across the northeast U.S.

Introduction

Cleo Hartwig belongs to a line of 'direct carvers' (taille direct) which includes both Jose de Creeft, with whom she studied, and Vincent Glinsky, her husband. With this technique the artist carves directly into the materials, without the use of intermediary steps. The conception and execution of the work is influenced by the density, veining, color, texture, and shape of the material.

Hartwig belongs to the generation of the 1930s and 1940s who advanced opportunities for women artists. She was an early member of the National Association of Women Artists (eventually serving as Vice President), and the New York Society of Women Artists (eventually serving as Recording Secretary). She is regarded as a member of The New York School, and her work was featured in the TV documentary, Women of the First Wave; Elders of the Century. Cleo Hartwig’s papers are held at the Smithsonian Institution’s Archives of American Art.  Her works are in such collections as the Brookgreen Gardens, SC 	and the Smithsonian American Art Museum.

Life
Cleo Hartwig was born in Webberville, Michigan on October 20, 1907. Her rural upbringing had a lasting influence on the development of her art. She was passionately interested in every detail of plant and animal life—from form to function—and observed nature with a mix of scientific attention and artistic observation.

“Growing up in rural Michigan before the days of mass media entertainment,” Hartwig once wrote, “there was ample time to explore the countryside, search for birds’ nests, raise caterpillars until they spun cocoons and hatched into moths or butterflies, find frogs’ eggs in the ponds and watch them develop into tadpoles. These first-hand observations and experiences are among my happiest and sharpest memories, and probably account for the many nature form subjects in my sculpture. There is such rich and endless variety in nature that one could, it seems, design nothing except bird forms and never exhaust the possibilities of interpretation.” 

Hartwig attended Portland High School between 1921-25, and entered Western State Teachers College (now Western Michigan University) in 1926. She interrupted her studies to teach art at Holland Junior High School (1926-29), and take summer art classes at Chicago Art Institute (1930, 1931). She returned to WSTC to graduate with an A.B. in 1932.

After graduation, she settled in New York City, finding employment as a teacher at The Town School (1934-36). During the summer of 1935 she studied art in Poland, Hungary, Rumania, and Germany. Hartwig then taught at the Ecole Francaise (1936-39) in New York, and exhibited for the first time in New York at The National Academy of Design (113th Annual, 1938). In 1939 she made a summer trip to France to study art, but returned home hastily because of the growing hostilities. Hartwig took up residence at Patchin Place, the historic Greenwich Village cul-de-sac, home to many famous artists of the early 20th century. (She remained at that address until her death). She joined the faculty of the Lenox School (1939-42), and exhibited her work in group shows at the Clay Club, National Academy of Design, Syracuse University, and Mt. Holyoke College. She was also part of the 1942 “Artists for Victory” exhibit at the Metropolitan Museum of Art.

After summer art study in Mexico (1941), Hartwig began to incorporate gestures from that country’s culture into her work. "Her carvings from the 1930s and early 1940s,” noted Ilene Fort, of the LA County Museum of Art, “are characterized by compact, massive forms, crisp outlines, and minimal details. In their blockiness, extreme simplification of shape, and coarse surfaces they especially echo Mesoamerican sculpture."

During World War II Hartwig did drafting at Bell Telephone Laboratories (1942–43), and technical illustrating at the Jordanoff Aviation Corp in NY (1943–45).  During this time, she held her first solo New York exhibition (Clay Club, 1943), and became active in many arts organizations. She was an early member of the National Association of Women Artists (eventually becoming Vice President), and the New York Society of Women Artists (Recording Secretary). At that time she also began her long association with the Sculptors Guild (Exec. Dir., Exec. Bd., Exec. VP), Audubon Artists (VP for Sculpture, Exhibition Committee), and New York Society of Ceramic Artists (Sculpture Jury).

The National Association of Women Artists (NAWA) awarded Hartwig the Anna Hyatt Huntington Prize for her Mandolin Player in 1945. That same year she exhibited with the Pennsylvania Academy of the Fine Arts, National Academy of Design, National Association of Women Artists, Audubon Artists, and New York Society of Ceramic Artists.  She also became a sculpture instructor at Cooper Union in New York and the Montclair Art Museum in New Jersey. In addition, she completed an important work for the architect Kenneth B. Norton: a "Family Group" for the Continental Companies Building on Williams St. in downtown Manhattan. For that commission Hartwig created an 8-foot-high bas-relief of a mother, father, and child, which was cast in aluminum and installed on the front of the building.

In 1951, Hartwig married fellow sculptor, Vincent Glinsky (1895-1975). Their son, Albert Glinsky, was born the following year. Throughout the 1950s she continued to teach, complete commissions (S.S. United States), and win prizes (including several from NAWA; Artists Equity; Audubon Artists; Munson Proctor Institute). In addition, Western Michigan University awarded her an Honorary master's degree (1951).

During the 1960s, Hartwig participated in the annual shows of the Sculptors Guild, exhibited her alabaster “Sea Foam” at the 1964 New York World’s Fair, and took part in the Bryant Park outdoor exhibits in midtown Manhattan. She worked with reproduction houses (Alva Museum Replicas, Sculpture Collectors, Collectors Guild) and executed a commission for the All-Faiths Memorial Tower in NJ (now George Washington Memorial Park). Her sculptural methods were examined in a feature article in American Artist magazine.

In the 1970s, Hartwig continued to collect honors: she was elected to the National Academy of Design as an Academician (1971) and received an Honorary Doctorate from Western Michigan University (1973). That same decade her work won awards from the National Sculpture Society, Sculptors Guild, National Association of Women Artists, Audubon Artists, and National Academy of Design. She had a solo show at the Montclair Art Museum (1971) and two joint shows with her husband, Vincent Glinsky (Sculpture Center, NY, 1972; Fairfield University, CT, 1974).

During the last decade of her life (1980s), Hartwig exhibited in more shows than in any previous decade—58 in all. Her "Owlet," shown at the New York Botanical Garden's Conservatory, was also featured in The New York Times. She was invited to serve on juries around the country, including the 4th North American Sculpture Exhibition, for which she was co-juror with Francisco Zúñiga. She received more awards, gave masterclasses, and continued to sculpt until just months before her death. Cleo Hartwig died on June 18, 1988 in New York City. After her passing, the Sculptors Guild dedicated its 1990 Hofstra University Exhibit Catalog to her memory, and the Audubon Society instituted an annual sculpture prize (still given today), in her honor.

References

Sources

 Brumme, C. Ludwig. Contemporary American Sculpture, Crown Publishers, N.Y., N.Y., 1948
 de Lys, Claudia & Rhudy, Frances. Centuries of Cats, Silvermine Publishers, Norwalk, 1971
 Falk, Peter H. Who Was Who in American Art: 1564-1975; 400 Years of Artists in America, Sound View Press, 1999
 Fort, Ilene Susan. The Figure in American Sculpture; A Question of Modernity, University of Washington Press, 1995
 Havlice, Patricia Pate, ed. Index to Artistic Biography, First Supplement, Scarecrow Press, NJ, 1973, 1981
 Mallett, Daniel Trowbridge. Mallett's Index of Artists; International-Biographical, Peter Smith, NY, 1948
 Meilach, Dona Z. Contemporary Stone Sculpture, Crown Publishers, N.Y., N.Y., 1970 	 	
 Padovano, Anthony. The Process of Sculpture, Doubleday and Company, Inc., N.Y., 1981
 Rubinstein, Charlotte Streifer. American Women Artists, Avon, NY, 1982
 Salmon, Robin R. Brookgreen Gardens Sculpture, vol. II Brookgreen Gardens, 1993
 
 Smith, Janet K. Interior Design and Decoration, Reinhold Pub. Corp. N.Y., N.Y., 1950
 Today's Art, Triangle Co., Tulsa, OK, Jan. 1976
 Watson-Jones, Virginia. Contemporary American Women Sculptors, Oryx Press, Phoenix, AZ, 1986

External links

Northwest Stone Sculptors Association historical article on women sculptors

1988 deaths
1907 births
American ceramists
American women sculptors
Artists from New York City
People from Ingham County, Michigan
20th-century American sculptors
Sculptors from Michigan
Western Michigan University alumni
School of the Art Institute of Chicago alumni
National Academy of Design members
National Association of Women Artists members
20th-century American women artists
Sculptors from New York (state)
20th-century ceramists
American women ceramists